Goeppertia majestica (syn. Calathea majestica), the majestic prayer plant, is a species of flowering plant in the family Marantaceae. It is native to Colombia, Ecuador, Peru, Bolivia, Guyana, and northern Brazil, and has been introduced to Venezuela. A large member of its genus, it has gained the Royal Horticultural Society's Award of Garden Merit.

References

majestica
Flora of western South America
Flora of North Brazil
Flora of Guyana
Plants described in 2012